Fern moss may refer to several varieties of moss that produce feathery fronds and can form a moss carpet across grass or bare patches of ground:

 Fissidens bryoides – lesser fern moss
 Hylocomium splendens or Hylocomium proliferum – mountain fern moss
 Thuidium species including:
 Thuidium abietinum – wiry fern moss
 Thuidium delicatulum – common fern moss
 Thuidium recognitum – hook-leaf fern moss 

Possibly also:
 Drepanocladus species including:
 Drepanocladus fluitans
 Drepanocladus uncinatus

Mosses